The 2009 European Parliament election in Romania was the election of the delegation from Romania to the European Parliament in 2009.

Candidates and elected MEPs
Among those expected to take up seats are (listed in the order they appear on the ballot):

For the Alliance PSD+PC (electoral alliance of PSD + PC):
 Adrian Severin, 55 years old
 Rovana Plumb, 49 years old
 Ioan-Mircea Paşcu, 60 years old
 Silvia Adriana Ţicău, 39 years old
 Daciana-Octavia Sârbu, 32 years old
 Corina Creţu, 32 years old
 Victor Boştinaru, 57 years old
 Sabin Cutaş, 41 years old, the only one from PC
 Cătălin Ivan, 31 years old
 Ioan Enciu, 56 years old, and
 Vasilica Dăncilă, 46 years old

For the Democratic Liberal Party (PDL):
 Theodor Stolojan, 66 years old
 Monica Macovei, 50 years old
 Traian Ungureanu, 51 years old
 Cristian Preda, 43 years old
 Marian-Jean Marinescu, 57 years old
 Iosif Matula, 51 years old
 Sebastian Bodu, 39 years old
 Petru Luhan, 32 years old
 Rareş Niculescu, 33 years old
 Oana Antonescu, 30 years old, and
 Elena Băsescu, 29 years old; ran separately as an independent.

For the National Liberal Party (PNL):
 Norica Nicolai, 51 years old
 Adina Vălean, 41 years old
 Renate Weber, 54 years old
 Ramona Mănescu, 37 years old, and
 Cristian Buşoi, 31 years oldFor the Democratic Alliance of Hungarians in Romania (UDMR): László Tőkés, 57 years old 
 Iuliu Winkler, 45 years old, and 
 Csaba Sógor, 45 years oldFor the Greater Romania Party (PRM):''
 Corneliu Vadim Tudor, 60 years old,
 Gigi Becali, 51 years old, and
 Claudiu Ciprian Tănăsescu, 44 years old

The other three electoral candidates did not pass the threshold:

 Christian Democratic National Peasants' Party, led by Marian Petre Miluţ; 
 Civic Force, led by Adrian-Ştefan Iuraşcu;
 Pavel Abraham as an independent candidate.

Opinion polls

Results 

The European Parliament election results confirmed the tendency towards a two-party system. While country-wide each of the two parties has won slightly less than 1/3 of the votes (in the end each got 1/3 of the seats in the EP), the two became the main political contestants in almost every county. Discounting the votes received by Elena Băsescu who afterwards re-joined PDL, PSD won the first place in 17 counties (with PDL arriving second in all of them), and PDL won the first place in 18 counties (with PSD arriving second in all of them but one).

UDMR, fourth-largest party country-wide, won the first place in six counties, trailed in the second place five times by PSD, and one time by PDL. PNL, the third largest party country-wide rose above that level only in Ilfov County, where it obtained the second place after PDL. PRM, the fifth party, was unable to arrive first or second in any of Romania's counties.

By county 

In the capital city of Bucharest, PDL won with 28.28% of the votes, with PSD in second with 27.87%. Four of the six sectors of the city were won by PDL and two by PSD, with the other party in second place:

References

External links
 Central Electoral Bureau
 Lists of candidates by party

Romania
European Parliament elections in Romania
2009 in Romania
2009 elections in Romania